Punjab State Power Corporation Limited (PSPCL) is the electricity generating and distributing company of the Government of Punjab state in India. It was formerly known as Punjab State Electricity Board (PSEB) which was unbundled by the government of Punjab into two companies on 16 April 2010 as Punjab State Power Corporation Ltd. (POWERCOM) and Punjab State Transmission Corporation Ltd. (TRANSCO).

History 
PSPCL was incorporated as company on 16 April 2010 and was given the responsibility of operating and maintenance of State's own generating projects and distribution system. The business of generation of power of erstwhile PSEB was transferred to PSPCL.

Power plants

Thermal 
 Rajpura Thermal Power Plant, Rajpura. It is a Case-2 based most efficient and top of the MERIT order thermal power plant in Punjab, with power capacity of 1400 MW (700x2).
 Talwandi Sabo Power Project, Mansa. It is the highest capacity thermal power plant in Punjab, with power capacity of 1980 MW (660x3).
 Guru Nanak Dev Thermal Plant, Bhatinda. It was a 460 MW (110x2 + 120x2 MW) coal-based thermal power plant. (closed)
 Guru Gobind Singh Super Thermal Power Plant, Ropar. It is a 1260 MW (6x210 MW) coal-based thermal power plant.
 Guru Hargobind Thermal Plant, Lehra Mohabbat, Bhatinda. It is a 920 MW (2x210 MW, 2x250 MW) coal-based thermal power plant.
 Goindwal Sahib Power Plant. It is a 540MW coal based thermal power plant.

Hydel 
 Ranjit Sagar Dam, 600 MW
 Shanan Power House. It is a 110 MW hydro power plant.
 Anandpur Sahib Hydel Channel, 134 MW
 Mukerian Hydel, 207 MW
 UBDC Hydroelectric Power House, 45 MW
 Bhakra Nangal Project
 Pong Dam Project
 Dehar Power House
 Thein Dam Project
 Shahpur Kandi Project

References 

Companies based in Punjab, India
Electric-generation companies of India
State agencies of Punjab, India
State electricity agencies of India
Energy in Punjab, India
2010 establishments in Punjab, India
Energy companies established in 2010
Indian companies established in 2010